Ajooba Kudrat Ka (English title The Magnificent Guardian) is a 1991 Bollywood horror thriller film directed by Shyam Ramsay and Tulsi Ramsay. It features Deepak Parashar, Hemant Birje and Manjeet Kullar in the lead roles. It was the first Bollywood film with a yeti theme.

Plot
The film centres on the platonic relationship between a young girl and a Yeti (a Himalayan monster).

Cast
 Deepak Parashar
 Hemant Birje
 Sonam
 Manjeet Kullar
 Shagufta Ali
 Mac Mohan
 Johnny Lever
 Anil Dhawan
 Goga Kapoor
 Beena Banerjee
 Sudhir
 Baby Shweta
 Huma Khan
 Randhir singh

Music 
"Dali Gulaab Ki Hoon" – Kavita Krishnamurthy
"Diwana" – Amit Kumar, Arpita Saha
"Hilla Hilla" – Johnny Lever
"Yeti I Love You" – Sadhana Sargam
"Yeti We Love You" – Sadhana Sargam
"Yeti We Love You" (Sad) – Sadhana Sargam
"Zoom Zooma Zoom" – Kavita Krishnamurthy, Jolly Mukherjee

References

External links 

1991 films
1990s Hindi-language films
Hindi-language thriller films
Films about Yeti
Indian horror thriller films
Films directed by Shyam Ramsay
Films directed by Tulsi Ramsay